Ryan Hartman (born September 20, 1994) is an American professional ice hockey forward for the Minnesota Wild of the National Hockey League (NHL). Hartman was selected by the Chicago Blackhawks in the first round (30th overall) of the 2013 NHL Entry Draft. He made his NHL debut in 2015 for the Blackhawks. He is the first player in NHL history to be born in the state of South Carolina.

Early life
Hartman was born on September 20, 1994, on Hilton Head Island, South Carolina. He was raised by Craig and Kim Hartman in West Dundee, Illinois, where he became a fan of the Chicago Blackhawks of the National Hockey League (NHL). He attended William Fremd High School in Palatine, Illinois, another suburb of Chicago. He began ice skating at the age of three and played minor ice hockey with a number of Chicago-area teams, most notably the Chicago Mission, with whom he won several state championships. With the Mission, Hartman became friends with fellow future NHL players Nick Schmaltz and Vinnie Hinostroza.

When he was 15, Hartman joined the USA Hockey National Team Development Program (NTDP), and his family moved to Ann Arbor, Michigan. His father built an ice skating rink in the backyard of their Michigan house, and Hartman used the rink to develop his shooting technique. During the 2011–12 NTDP season, Hartman was second on the team with 38 points in 55 games.

Playing career

Junior 
Hartman joined the Plymouth Whalers of the Ontario Hockey League for the 2012–13 OHL season and was invited to take part in the CHL Top Prospects Game. He was then selected to play with the gold-medal-winning American squad at the IIHF World U20 Championship. Hartman was rated as a top prospect, fulfilling the expectation to be a first-round selection at the 2013 NHL Entry Draft.

Professional

Chicago Blackhawks 
On November 18, 2013, the Chicago Blackhawks signed Hartman to a three-year entry-level contract. Hartman made his NHL debut on February 13, 2015, against the New Jersey Devils. Hartman started the  2016–17 NHL season with the Blackhawks. The team sought to harness Hartman's physical play style after trading away Andrew Shaw in the offseason. He scored the first goal of his career against Jake Allen of the St. Louis Blues during the NHL's season opener on October 12, 2016. Hartman scored his first career hat trick against the Nashville Predators on January 8, 2017. Hartman finished the season with 19 goals and 12 assists.

During the 2017–18 season, Hartman recorded eight goals and 17 assists in 57 appearances for the Blackhawks. He rotated through the Blackhawks lineup, but primarily skated as a bottom-six forward.

Nashville Predators 
On February 26, 2018, Hartman along with a fifth-round pick in 2018 NHL Entry Draft was traded to the Nashville Predators in exchange for Victor Ejdsell, first-round and fourth-round picks in 2018. He appeared in 21 regular season games for Nashville, where he tallied three goals and three assists. The NHL suspended Hartman for one game during the first round of the 2018 Stanley Cup playoffs after he delivered an illegal check to Carl Soderberg.

Philadelphia Flyers 
In the 2018–19 season, at the NHL trade deadline on February 25, 2019, the Predators traded Hartman, along with a conditional fourth-round pick in 2020, to the Philadelphia Flyers in exchange for Wayne Simmonds. He added two goals and six points through 19 games with the Flyers as the club missed the playoffs.

Minnesota Wild 
On June 24, Hartman was again involved in a trade, dealt by the Flyers to the Dallas Stars in exchange for Tyler Pitlick. The following day, Hartman was not tendered a qualifying offer from the Stars, enabling him to become a free agent on July 1.

On the opening day of free agency, Hartman was signed to a two-year, $3.8 million contract with the Minnesota Wild on July 1, 2019.

On April 22, 2021, Hartman signed a three-year, $5.1 million contract extension with the Wild.

International play

Hartman competed for the United States in the 2012 IIHF World U18 Championships. He recorded six points, two goals and four assists, in six games. As a member of the American team, Hartman received a gold medal.

Hartman played for the U.S. in the 2013 World Junior Ice Hockey Championships. He accumulated three points, two goals and an assist, in seven games. As a member of the U.S. team, Hartman received a gold medal. He posted four points with the U.S. team in the 2014 World Junior Ice Hockey Championships, two goals and two assists, in five games.

Personal life
Hartman originally committed to playing college hockey at Miami University, but later de-committed from the school to play for the Plymouth Whalers. His younger brother Tanner played hockey for the Chicago Fury U15 team, and currently plays for the New Hampshire Jr. Monarchs of the NCDC. He has a white German Shepherd named Riley.

Hartman also played football for the Bloomingdale Bears youth football team along with his friend and former teammate Vinnie Hinostroza.

Career statistics

Regular season and playoffs

International

Awards and honors

References

External links

1994 births
Chicago Blackhawks draft picks
Chicago Blackhawks players
Ice hockey people from South Carolina
Ice hockey players from Illinois
Living people
Minnesota Wild players
Nashville Predators players
National Hockey League first-round draft picks
People from Hilton Head, South Carolina
People from West Dundee, Illinois
Philadelphia Flyers players
Plymouth Whalers players
Rockford IceHogs (AHL) players
USA Hockey National Team Development Program players
American men's ice hockey right wingers